Cornelius Butcher (born 27 January 1980) is a Saint Lucian international footballer who plays as a striker.

Career
He made his international debut for Saint Lucia in 2010.

References

1980 births
Living people
Saint Lucian footballers
Saint Lucia international footballers
Association football forwards
Place of birth missing (living people)